Love on the Side is a 2004 romance comedy film about a small town waitress who seeks the attention of a most eligible bachelor. The film stars Marla Sokoloff, Jennifer Tilly and Monika Schnarre, is written by Brigitte Talevski and directed by Vic Sarin.

Cast
 Marla Sokoloff as Eve Stuckley
 Jennifer Tilly as Alma
 Monika Schnarre as Linda Avery
 Dave Thomas as Red
 Jonathan Cherry as Chuck Stuckley
 Marnie Alton as Verline
 Barry Watson as Jeff Sweeney
 Peter Benson as Marquee Man
 Kee Chan as Stoney
 Len Doncheff as Len
 Aaron Grain as Chip Owens
 Jesse Moss as Dwayne
 Alvin Sanders as Walt
 Frank C. Turner as Wilbur
 Matthew Safran as Radio Announcer (voice)
 Yvette Yip as Art Dealer (voice)

External links
 
 
 

2004 films
2004 romantic comedy films
American LGBT-related films
LGBT-related romantic comedy films
American romantic comedy films
2004 LGBT-related films
2000s American films